This is a list of Australian architects.

A 

Return to top of page

B 

Return to top of page

C 

Return to top of page

D 

Return to top of page

E 

Return to top of page

F 

Return to top of page

G 

Return to top of page

H 

Return to top of page

I 

Return to top of page

J 

Return to top of page

K 

Return to top of page

L 

Return to top of page

M 

Return to top of page

N 

Return to top of page

O 

Return to top of page

P 

Return to top of page

R 

Return to top of page

S 

Return to top of page

T 

Return to top of page

U 

Return to top of page

V 

Return to top of page

W 

Return to top of page

See also 
 Australian architectural styles
 New South Wales Government Architect
 Principal Architect (Western Australia)

References

External links 
 

Architects
Australian
Australian architects